North Lampung Regency (Kabupaten Lampung Utara) is a regency (kabupaten) of Lampung Province, Sumatra, in Indonesia. It has an area of 2,725.63 km2 and had a population of 583,925 at the 2010 census and 633,099 at the 2020 census. The regency seat is Kotabumi.

Administrative divisions
Administratively the regency is divided into twenty-three districts (kecamatan), tabulated below with their areas and their populations at the 2010 census and the 2020 census.

The districts are sub-divided into 247 villages (rural desa and urban kelurahan).

History
North Lampung Regency, which used to be the largest district in Lampung, Based on Law no, 1 of 1945, during the independence of the Republic of Indonesia, North Lampung Regency was the administrative area of the Kewedanan Marga, On December 3, 1952 the system of Marga, 75 Marga and 11 Buay Indeling Residentie Lampung 1:750.000 Derukkrij 1930 was abolished, with the issuance of Resident Presiden No. 153 of 1952. However, North Lampung after the issuance of Law No. RI. 14 of 1964 concerning the formation of Lampung Province, then North became part of the Lampung Province, previously North Lampung was part of South Sumatra Province (Palembang). Due to the expansion of several districts. So that the Low of the Republik of Indonesia Number 18 of 1965 was issued.

In the history of North Lampung Regency, the first expansion area was the formation of West Lampung Regency with the capital city Liwa, Indonesia. This formation is based on Law No. 6 of 1991.

The secand division of the territory is the establishment of Tulang Bawang Regency, which was established based on Law no. 2 of 1997. The third expansion area is the formation of Way Kanan Regency. This formation is based on the Law of the Republik of Indonesia Number 12 of 1999.

Tourist attractions 
Curup Selampung Waterfall 
Curup Paten Waterfall 
Tirta Shinta Dam 
Way Rarem Dam

References

Regencies of Lampung